Kwaku (Kweku, Kuuku, Korku, Kɔku, Kouakou), is an Akan given name for male children born on Wednesday to the Akan and Ewe ethnic groups. Akan birthday names are associated with appellations that give an indication of the character of people born on such days. Typical appellations for Kwaku are Atobi, Daaku or Bonsam meaning evil.

Origin and Meaning of Kwaku 
In the Akan culture, day names are known to be derived from deities. Kwaku originated from Wukuada and the Lord of Life's Sky (heavenly) Host deity of the day Wednesday. Males named Kwaku can be mean-spirited and tenacious.

Male variants of Kwaku 
Day names in Ghana vary in spelling among the various Akan subgroups.  The name is spelt Kwaku by the Akuapem and Ashanti subgroups while the Fante subgroup spell it as Kweku.

Female Version of Kwaku
In the Akan culture and other local cultures in Ghana, day names come in pairs for males and females. The variant of the name used for a female child born on Wednesday is Akua.

Notable people with the name Kwaku 
Most Ghanaian children have their cultural day names in combination with their English or Christian names. Some notable people with such names are:

 Kwaku Boateng Canadian high jumper
 (Francis) Kwaku Sakyi Addo, Ghanaian radio journalist
 Kwaku Alston American photographer
 Kwaku Manu, Ghanaian Actor
 Kwaku Sintim Misa, Ghanaian actor
 Kwaku Duah eighth king of the Ashanti Kingdom
Kwaku Karikari, Ghanaian footballer
 (Anthony) Rebop Kwaku Baah, Ghanaian percussionist
 Kwaku, Antiguan and Barbudan national hero

See also
 Ketikoti

References

Akan given names
Masculine given names